Javere Bell (born 20 September 1992) is a Jamaican sprinter. He competed in the 4x400 metres relay event at the 2013 World Championships in Athletics, winning a silver medal.

References

1992 births
Living people
Jamaican male sprinters
Place of birth missing (living people)
Athletes (track and field) at the 2015 Pan American Games
Pan American Games competitors for Jamaica